Tiphanie and Typhanie is a feminine given name. Notable people with the name include:

 Tiphanie Brooke (born 1981), American artist
 Typhanie Degois (born 1993), French politician
 Tiphanie Yanique (born 1978), Caribbean American writer

See also
 Tiphaine (disambiguation)

Feminine given names